Antaeotricha vacata is a moth of the family Depressariidae. It is endemic to Grenada and Trinidad in the Caribbean.

The wingspan is 20–22 mm. The forewings are light greyish-ochreous with the costal edge whitish-ochreous. The hindwings are light grey with the costa dilated on the anterior half and with a broad median projection of long ochreous-whitish hair-scales partially suffused light grey.

References

External links
West Indian Stenomidae (Lepidoptera: Gelechioidea)

Moths described in 1925
vacata
Moths of the Caribbean